Pahokee High School (also known as Pahokee Junior Senior High School) is a historic school in Pahokee, Florida. It is currently located at 900 Larrimore Road. On November 15, 1996, The old Pahokee High School building on E. Main St. was added to the U.S. National Register of Historic Places. It was designed by architect William Manly King.

Athletics
Pahokee's football team, the Blue Devils, has won 6 state championships in 1989, 2003, 2004, 2006, 2007 and 2008, including a span from 2006 to 2007 which featured a 28–0 record, a #6 national ranking, and 2 state championships.

Notable alumni
Richard Ash, football player for Dallas Cowboys
Bill Bentley, football player for Detroit Lions
Anquan Boldin, football player for Arizona Cardinals, Baltimore Ravens, San Francisco 49ers
Kevin Bouie, football player for multiple NFL teams
Jim Burroughs, football player for Indianapolis Colts
Rickey Jackson, Pro Football Hall of Fame linebacker
Janoris Jenkins, football player for Tennessee Titans
Pernell McPhee, football player for Chicago Bears, Baltimore Ravens
Eric Moore, football player for New England Patriots, St. Louis Rams
Alphonso Smith, football player for Detroit Lions
Antone Smith, football player for Atlanta Falcons
Vincent Smith, football player for Michigan Wolverines
Mel Tillis, singer, Country Music Hall of Fame inductee
Andre Waters, football player for Philadelphia Eagles, had CTE Chronic traumatic encephalopathy
Riquna Williams, basketball player for WNBA's Las Vegas Aces

References

External links

  
 Old Pahokee High School at Florida's Office of Cultural and Historical Programs (March 2007 archive copy)

National Register of Historic Places in Palm Beach County, Florida
High schools in Palm Beach County, Florida
Public high schools in Florida